Vicchio is a town and comune (municipality) in the Metropolitan City of Florence in the Italian region Tuscany, located about  northeast of Florence.

Geography
Vicchio borders the municipalities of Borgo San Lorenzo, Dicomano, Marradi and Pontassieve. It counts the hamlets (frazioni) of Ampinana, Arsella, Barbiana, Boccagnello, Bovino, Bricciana, Campestri, Casole, Cistio, Cuccino, Farneto, Gattaia, Gracchia, Mirandola, Molezzano, Mulinuccio, Padule, Paterno, Piazzano, Pilarciano, Pimaggiore, Ponte a Vicchio, Rossoio, Rostolena, Rupecanina, Scopeto, Uliveta, Vespignano, Vezzano, Villore and Zufolana.

Demographics

Gallery

Personalities
Many famous Italian painters were born near Vicchio: Giotto (in the frazione of Colle di Vespignano), Fra Angelico (at Rupecanina), Giovanni Malesci, Rutilio Muti, Armeno Mattioli and Foresto Marianini. There is a 3.2 meter statue of Giotto in Vicchio's central square, the Piazza di Giotto. It was also the birthplace of Jean-Baptiste Lully (Baptized Giovanni Battista Lulli), who would become the founder of the French opera tradition.
Two victims of the Monster of Florence (killed nearby the town in 1984), Pia Rontini and Claudio Stefanacci, were citizens of Vicchio.

Twin cities
 Tolmin, Slovenia, since 1981

References

External links

 Vicchio official website

Cities and towns in Tuscany